Anjuman Moinia Fakhriya Chishtiya Khuddam Khwaja Saheb or Anjuman Syedzadgan is an Indian representative body of Khadims of  Ajmer Sharif Dargah for the affair and rights of Khadim Community (The Descendants of Lakha Bheel son of King Prithviraj III of Ajmer), registered under the Society Registration Act, 1860.

See also 
 Khadem
 Dargah Committee, Ajmer
 Anderkoti

References 

Islamic organisations based in India
Sufism in India
Ajmer